Jackson is a city in and the county seat of Cape Girardeau County, Missouri, United States. It is a principal city of the Cape Girardeau–Jackson, MO-IL Metropolitan Statistical Area. The population of Jackson was 15,481 at the 2020 census.

History

In 1813, Cape Girardeau County succeeded Cape Girardeau District, and the Court of Common Pleas and the Court of General Quarter-Sessions of the Peace in Cape Girardeau were superseded by the Court of Common Pleas, leading to a new seat of justice.  The seat of the county and the courts were at first held on the plantation of Thomas Bull about one and one-half mile south of present-day Jackson. Land was then purchased along Hubble Creek for the county seat in 1814.

The first post office was established in 1814 when the area was called Birdstown. The name was changed to Jackson on August 31, 1819, named for Andrew Jackson, a general popular for his role in the War of 1812. It was the first town to be named after Andrew Jackson. The town was platted in 1815. The Missouri Herald, the third newspaper in state, was established here on June 25, 1819. In 1818, the town already had a population of 300. The first county courthouse was built in 1818 on Jackson's public square.

Although its initial growth was rapid, the economy of the City of Jackson developed conservatively. The town suffered a setback in June, 1833, when Cholera spread killing 128.  Cholera struck again on June 10, 1852, causing all abled bodies to flee the town until the epidemic had run its course. In 1841, a bank was established. A flour mill was constructed in 1855 and another in 1873. But the community could not escape the impact of the American Civil War; on June 24, 1861, a military skirmish took place near Jackson between units of the Union Army and the Confederate Army.

In 1877, Jackson was linked to Cape Girardeau by the first long-distance railway service line in Missouri. By 1884, the population of the City of Jackson had grown to 2,105, and the town supported 50 businesses.  In 1884, by popular vote, it was decided to incorporate Jackson as a city of the fourth class. The courthouse built in 1818 burned down in 1870. The current courthouse was built in 1908 and is “on the square” in the center of Uptown Jackson where Jones Drug Store still runs and serves the community since 1871.

The Big Hill Farmstead Historic District, Abraham Byrd House, Frizel-Welling House, Jackson Uptown Commercial Historic District, and McKendree Chapel are listed on the National Register of Historic Places.

Geography
Jackson is located on US Route 61 approximately seven miles northwest of Cape Girardeau. Hubble Creek and its tributary Goose Creek flow through the city.

Climate

Demographics

2010 census
At the 2010 census there were 13,758 people, 5,496 households, and 3,827 families living in the city. The racial makeup of the city was 95.81% White, 1.65% Black or African American, 0.27% Native American, 0.57% Asian, 0.01% Native Hawaiian or Pacific Islander, 0.32% from other races, and 1.37% from two or more races. Hispanic or Latino of any race were 1.24%.

Of the 5,496 households 36.0% had children under the age of 18 living with them, 53.3% were married couples living together, 11.9% had a female householder with no husband present, 4.4% had a male householder with no wife present, and 30.4% were non-families. 26.4% of households were one person and 11.3% were one person aged 65 or older. The average household size was 2.46 and the average family size was 2.96.

The median age was 37.3 years. 25.6% of residents were under the age of 18; 8.3% were between the ages of 18 and 24; 26.1% were from 25 to 44; 24.8% were from 45 to 64; and 15.2% were 65 or older. The gender makeup of the city was 47.0% male and 53.0% female.

2000 census
At the 2000 census there were 11,947 people, 4,708 households, and 3,385 families living in the city. The racial makeup of the city was 96.57% White, 1.36% African American, 0.28% Native American, 0.56% Asian, 0.03% Pacific Islander, 0.19% from other races, and 1.01% from two or more races. Hispanic or Latino of any race were 0.76%.

Of the 4,708 households 36.9% had children under the age of 18 living with them, 59.2% were married couples living together, 9.9% had a female householder with no husband present, and 28.1% were non-families. 25.1% of households were one person and 11.9% were one person aged 65 or older. The average household size was 2.50 and the average family size was 2.98.

The age distribution was 26.6% under the age of 18, 8.2% from 18 to 24, 29.9% from 25 to 44, 21.3% from 45 to 64, and 14.0% 65 or older. The median age was 36 years. For every 100 females, there were 89.8 males. For every 100 females age 18 and over, there were 85.8 males.

The median household income was $40,412 and the median family income  was $46,854. Males had a median income of $35,212 versus $19,994 for females. The per capita income for the city was $18,799. About 5.0% of families and 6.7% of the population were below the poverty line, including 6.7% of those under age 18 and 11.8% of those age 65 or over.

Government

Education
Most of Jackson is in Jackson R-2 School District. A small portion is in the Cape Girardeau School District. Jackson R-2 operates Jackson High School. The Cape Girardeau district operates Central High School.

Jackson has a public library, a branch of the Riverside Regional Library.

Notable people
 Linda M. Godwin, NASA astronaut
 Gary Friedrich, writer of the comic book Ghost Rider
 Roy Thomas, writer (Marvel and DC Comics) and editor (Marvel). Writer of various movie scripts.
 Louis C. Wagner, Jr., United States Army four-star general
 Marie Elizabeth Watkins Oliver, "the Betsy Ross of Missouri" was the designer and creator of the Missouri State Flag
 Edwin C. Horrell, American football player and coach.

References

External links
 The City of Jackson website
 Cape Girardeau
 Historic maps of Jackson in the Sanborn Maps of Missouri Collection at the University of Missouri

Cities in Cape Girardeau County, Missouri
County seats in Missouri
Cape Girardeau–Jackson metropolitan area
Cities in Missouri
1814 establishments in Missouri Territory